Runaway is a 2005 film directed by Tim McCann. It is about two siblings, Michael and Dylan Adler, twenty-one and eight years old respectively, who run away from home and attempt to start a new life because of a pedophile father. Michael, who had been previously molested by his father, tries to protect his brother from their dad.

Runaway was written by Bill True and won the Best Narrative Feature award at the 2005 Austin Film Festival.

The film was produced by Alan Klingenstein.

Cast
Aaron Stanford as Michael Adler 
Robin Tunney as Carly 
Phillip Blancero as Customer in Mo's 
Karla Cary as Customer in Mo's 
Anthony Corrado as Motel Manager 
Jennifer Dempster as News Reporter 
Tanya Ferro as Police Officer 
Michael Gaston as Jesse Adler 
Peter Gerety as Mo
Jason Gervais as Police Officer 
Robert Grcywa as Bert 
James W. Harrison III as Quarrelling Meth Addict 
Andrew D. Jones as Police Officer 
Ray Kennedy as Police Officer 
Terry Kinney as Dr. Maxim 
Brian Kozloski as Police Officer 
Melissa Leo as Lisa Adler 
Patrick McCulloch as Police Officer 
Smokey Nelson as Quarreling Meth Addict 
Zack Savage as Dylan 
Bill Wolff as Eyewitness on TV
Danny Waer as Police Officer

References

External links

2005 films
2005 drama films
Films directed by Tim McCann
2000s English-language films
American drama films
2000s American films